Memórias do Instituto Oswaldo Cruz (Portuguese for "Memoirs of the Oswaldo Cruz Institute") is a peer-reviewed open access medical journal covering parasitology, microbiology, and tropical medicine. It was established in 1909 by the Brazilian physician Oswaldo Cruz and is published by the Oswaldo Cruz Foundation (FIOCRUZ) eight times a year. The editor-in-chief is Adeilton Brandão (IOC/FIOCRUZ).

Abstracting and indexing 
The journal is abstracted and indexed in the following bibliographic databases:

According to the Journal Citation Reports, the journal has a 2014 impact factor of 1.592.

References

External links 
 

Parasitology journals
Microbiology journals
Tropical medicine and hygiene journals
Creative Commons Attribution-licensed journals
English-language journals
Publications established in 1909
Academic journals published by independent research institutes
Academic journals published by non-profit organizations of Brazil